Katy Nichole Litwiller is an American Christian musician, songwriter and worship leader. Nichole made her debut in 2022, with the release of the single "In Jesus Name (God of Possible)" through Centricity Music. "In Jesus Name (God of Possible)" was Nichole's breakthrough hit, having reached number one on Billboard's Hot Christian Songs chart and Bubbling Under Hot 100 chart. Her follow-up single, "God Is in This Story" with Big Daddy Weave, also reached number one on the Hot Christian Songs chart. Nichole also released her debut self-titled extended play, containing "In Jesus Name (God of Possible)" and "God Is In This Story". The EP debuted at number seven on the Top Christian Albums chart in the United States.

Career
On January 26, 2022, Nichole released "In Jesus Name (God of Possible)" as her debut single. "In Jesus Name (God of Possible)" went on to become Nichole's breakthrough hit single, peaking at number one on the Hot Christian Songs chart, and the Christian Airplay chart. "In Jesus Name (God of Possible)" received a GMA Dove Award nomination for Pop/Contemporary Recorded Song of the Year at the 2022 GMA Dove Awards. On June 10, 2022, Nichole and Big Daddy Weave released the single "God Is in This Story". The song peaked at number one on the Hot Christian Songs chart. Nichole released her debut extended play, Katy Nichole, on June 24, 2022. The EP debuted at number seven on the Top Christian Albums chart in the United States. On October 21, 2022, Nichole released "O What a King" released as a single. "O What a King" peaked at number 14 on the Hot Christian Songs chart.

Discography

Studio albums

EPs

Singles

As lead artist

As featured artist

Promotional singles

Other charted songs

Tours
Supporting
 I Still Believe Tour with Jeremy Camp (2022)
 An Evening at the Story House Matthew West (2022)
 K-LOVE Christmas Tour (2022)

Awards and nominations

American Music Awards

!Ref.
|-
| 2022
| Katy Nichole
| Favorite Inspirational Artist
| 
| 
|-
|}

GMA Dove Awards

!
|-
| 2022
| "In Jesus Name (God of Possible)"
| Pop/Contemporary Recorded Song of the Year
| 
| 
|-
|}

See also
 List of Christian worship music artists

References

External links
 
  on AllMusic

2000 births
Living people
American women singer-songwriters
American performers of Christian music
Composers of Christian music
Musicians from Mesa, Arizona
21st-century American women singers
21st-century American singers
Christians from Arizona
Singer-songwriters from Arizona
Performers of contemporary worship music